Pieter, Baron Timmermans (Ninove, 14 June 1964) is a Belgian businessman and CEO of the Federation of Belgian Enterprises.

Education
He obtained a master's degree in business economics from the KU Leuven.

Career
Since May 2012, Pieter Timmermans is CEO of the Federation of Belgian Enterprises and since 27 May 2013 he is a regent of the National Bank of Belgium.

Sources
 Pieter Timmermans (NBB)

1964 births
Living people
Belgian businesspeople
KU Leuven alumni
People from Ninove